Benediktas Vanagas (born ) is a Lithuanian rally driver. Vanagas is one of the few racing drivers in the Baltic states who has achieved good results competing in various auto racing disciplines, such as rallying, rally raid racing, endurance racing and off-road competitions, though he most often competes as a rally driver. He is a member of the Inbank Toyota Gazoo Racing Baltics. Vanagas still holds the record for the best overall result in a car class in the Baltics as well as for a Lithuanian driver.

Achievements
2009 - Silk Way Rally: 5th place in class, 8th overall.
 2009 - Ladoga Trophy: 2nd place in TR1 class, 3 Stages won.
 2010 - Silk Way Rally: 2nd place in class, 7th overall, 1 Stage won.
2010 - Ladoga Trophy: 2nd place in TR1 class, 7 Stages won.
2012 - Rally Sweden: 4th place in N4 class.
 2012 - Lithuania rally championship: 3rd place in N4, II overall.
 2012 - 1000 kilometers race: 2nd place in qualification. 
 2013 - Dakar Rally: 65th place overall.
 2013 - 1000 kilometers race: 1st place overall. 
 2014 - Dakar Rally: 35th place overall.
 2015 - Dakar Rally: 24th place overall and 1st place among private teams. 
 2015 - FIA European Cup for Cross-Country Bajas - Italian Baja: 6th place in the 1st group. 
 2015 - 1000 kilometers race: 6th place overall.
 2016 - Dakar Rally: 26th place overall.
 2016 - 1000 kilometers race: 1st place overall.
 2017 - FIA Baltic Rally Trophy: 1st place overall. 
 2018 - Dakar Rally: 30th place overall.
2018 - Winter Rally: 1st place overall.
2019 - Dakar Rally: 11th place overall.
2020 - Dakar Rally: 15th place overall.
2021 - Dakar Rally: 12th place overall. 
2021 - FIA European Cup for Cross-Country Bajas - Baja Poland: 3rd place overall.
2022 - FIA European Cup for Cross-Country Bajas - Hungarian Baja: 1st place overall.

Dakar results
Vanagas has been a consistent performer on the Dakar since making his debut in 2013, reaching the finish line in all but three of his eleven participations.

References

External links
Official website

Lithuanian racing drivers
1977 births
Living people
Dakar Rally drivers

Toyota Gazoo Racing drivers